Parkway Place is an upscale shopping mall in Huntsville, Alabama that opened on October 16, 2002. Parkway Place is located at the site of the older Parkway City Mall, which was torn down to allow for the construction of the newer facility. The mall is located at the intersection of Memorial Parkway (U.S. 231) and Drake Avenue. The mall is now the only indoor shopping mall in Huntsville after Madison Square Mall closed in early 2017.

Parkway Place offers shoppers of the Tennessee Valley several stores that are unique to the Huntsville market, including, Torrid, Build-A-Bear Workshop, American Eagle/Aerie, and Chico's. The mall has over 2,800 free parking spaces (including the parking deck) and seats 400 people in the food court.

Parkway Place is owned by CBL & Associates Properties, Inc.

History
The original Parkway Shopping Center opened in 1957 as an open-air strip mall with 25 stores, with seven more stores added two years later.
Two major events in the shopping complex's history occurred in 1974. First, the mall was acquired by Arlen Real Estate (which later became CBL), and a tornado destroyed the south end of the center.
In February 1976, the shopping complex was re-opened as Parkway City Mall, a single-level enclosed mall, with Pizitz (later purchased by McRae's), Montgomery Ward and Parisian as anchors. It was Huntsville's largest shopping center until Madison Square Mall opened in 1984.
Plans began in 1998 to redevelop the location. The mall was already losing stores, and, in 2001, the Montgomery Ward chain closed all of its retail stores, costing the shopping complex one of its three anchors.
The demolition of Parkway City Mall and 2002 construction of Parkway Place were completed in stages so as to allow the greatest possible open time for Piccadilly Cafeteria, one of the major remaining businesses at the time of the demolition. In January 2007, an expansion to the mall began, enlarging the anchor spot used by Parisian as it redeveloped into a Belk store. Parisian was then renamed Belk on September 12, 2007.

Anchor stores
Dillard's 
Belk

Former anchors
Parisian (sold to Belk in 2007)

References

External links
Parkway Place Mall website

Shopping malls established in 1957
Shopping malls in Huntsville, Alabama
CBL Properties